Uroiphis is a genus of mites in the family Laelapidae.

Species
 Uroiphis scabratus Berlese, 1903     
 Uroiphis striatus Berlese, 1903

References

Laelapidae